David George Stead (6 March 1877 – 2 August 1957) was an Australian marine biologist, ichthyologist, oceanographer, conservationist and writer.  He was born at St Leonards in Sydney, and educated at public schools and the Sydney Technical College. In 1909 he was a founder of, and during its early years the main driving force behind, the Wildlife Preservation Society of Australia.  In December 1912 he became an inaugural committee member of the Eugenics Society of New South Wales. His career included many government positions both in Australia and in Malaya.  He served as the Australian representative on international committees concerned with fisheries science, marine biology and oceanography. He married three times, the third time to botanist and writer Thistle Yolette Harris in 1951.  He died at his home in Watsons Bay, Sydney.

Stead is commemorated in the David G. Stead Memorial Wild Life Research Foundation of Australia, and the Wirrimbirra Sanctuary at Bargo, New South Wales, established by his third wife in his memory in the early 1960s.  Mount Stead in the Blue Mountains is named after him.  He was survived by two daughters and three sons of his second marriage and by the only child of his first marriage, the novelist Christina Stead.

Sam in The Man Who Loved Children by Christina Stead is partly modelled on her father.

Publications
As well as numerous papers and articles, books authored by Stead include:
 1905 – Crustaceans: Ancient, Modern and Mythical. With notes on edible crustaceans of NSW. William Brooks: Sydney.
 1906 – Fishes of Australia. A Popular and Systematic Guide to the Study of the Wealth within our Waters. William Brooks: Sydney.
 1907 – Eggs and Breeding Habits of Fishes with Special Reference to Australian Species. William Brooks: Sydney.
 1908 – The Edible Fishes of New South Wales. Their Present Importance and Their Potentialities. NSW Government: Sydney.
 1923 – General report upon the fisheries of British Malaya with recommendations for future development. A.J. Kent, Govt. Printer.
 1933 – Giants and Pigmies of the Deep: a Story of Australian Sea Denizens. Shakespeare Head Press: Sydney.
 1943 – The Tree Book. Consolidated Press: Sydney.
 1935 – The Rabbit in Australia. Sydney.
 1963 – Sharks and Rays of Australian Seas. Angus & Robertson: Sydney.

See also
:Category:Taxa named by David George Stead

References

External links
 Wirrimbirra Flora and Fauna Sanctuary

1877 births
1957 deaths
Australian biologists
Australian marine biologists
Australian conservationists
Australian non-fiction writers
Australian ichthyologists